Door Ka Raahi is a 1971 Bollywood drama film directed by Kishore Kumar. The film stars Tanuja, Kishore Kumar and Ashok Kumar. The film is a great depiction of the directorial abilities of Kishore Kumar and his vision of the eternal world. The film strives to deliver a very strong message to humanity using the simplest possible language. Door Ka Raahi is the story of a person named "Prashant" who is on an unending journey for the wellness of society. Door Ka Rahi is also all about Kishore Kumar's philosophy of life. It depicts with brilliance Kishore Kumar's inner self and the way he construed life in all its ups and downs. The movie is a metaphor that depicts the endless eternal journey of the human soul that is unaware of its destiny and has to continue with its journey in the quest of the eternal unknown. Kishore-da's all-time favourite "Panthi hoon main us path ka aanth nahi jiska" and "Chalti chali je Zindagi ki safar" are the manifestation of his eternal quest. His exuberance and flamboyance were the veil for this inwardly lonely person. His loneliness and brilliance found expression in Door Ka Rahi and Door Vadiyon Mein Kahin.

Cast
Kishore Kumar
Tanuja
Ashok Kumar
Padma Khanna
Amit Kumar
Abhi Bhattacharya
Asit Sen
Hiralal
Ganga

Songs

All the songs were composed by Kishore Kumar. The lyrics were written by Irshad and Kishore Kumar, except for the songs “Ek Din Aur Aa Gaya,” & "Chalti chale jaaye zindagi"  which were written by Shailendra.

External links
 

1971 films
1970s Hindi-language films
1971 drama films
Films scored by Kishore Kumar
Films directed by Kishore Kumar
Indian drama films
Hindi-language drama films